The siege of Sidon was an event in the aftermath of the First Crusade. The coastal city of Sidon was captured by the forces of Baldwin I of Jerusalem and Sigurd I of Norway, with assistance from the Ordelafo Faliero, Doge of Venice.

Background 

In August 1108, Baldwin I marched out against Sidon, with the support of a squadron of sailor-adventurers from various Italian cities. However, the Egyptian fleet defeated the Italians in a sea-battle outside the harbour. Upon the arrival of additional Turkish horsemen from Damascus, Baldwin decided to lift the siege.

In the summer of 1110, a Norwegian fleet of 60 ships arrived in the Levant under the command of King Sigurd. Arriving in Acre he was received by Baldwin I, King of Jerusalem. Together they made a journey to the river Jordan, after which Baldwin asked for help in capturing Muslim-held ports on the coast. Sigurd's answer was that "they had come for the purpose of devoting themselves to the service of Christ", and accompanied him to take the city of Sidon, which had been re-fortified by the Fatimids in 1098.

The siege

Baldwin's army besieged the city by land, while the Norwegians came by sea. A naval force was needed to prevent assistance from the Fatimid fleet at Tyre. Repelling it was however only made possible with the fortunate arrival of a Venetian fleet. The city fell after 47 days.

The Icelandic skald Einarr Skúlason gives the following account.

Aftermath 
When the city surrendered, King Baldwin gave the same terms of surrender he had previously given to Arsuf and Acre. He allowed safe conduct of passage for those leaving and even allowed some members of the Muslim populace to remain in peace.

By order of Baldwin and the Patriarch of Jerusalem, Ghibbelin of Arles, a splinter was taken off the holy cross and given to Sigurd.

The Lordship of Sidon was created and given to Eustace Grenier, later a constable of the Kingdom of Jerusalem.

Notes

References

Sources 
Battles and sieges, Tony Jaques
The Crusades and the expansion of Catholic Christendom, 1000–1714, John France
The Second Crusade, Jonathan Phillips
The chronicle of Ibn al-Athīr for the crusading period from al-Kāmil fīʼl-taʼrīkh, ʻIzz al-Dīn Ibn al-Athīr and Donald Sidney
Saga of Sigurd the Crusader and His Brothers Eystein and Olaf

Norwegian Crusade
Battles involving Norway
Sidon
Sidon
Sidon
Sidon District
1110s in the Kingdom of  Jerusalem
Sidon
1110 in Asia